The Lane Avenue Bridge is a cable-stayed bridge over the Olentangy River in the American city of Columbus, Ohio. Designed by Jones-Stuckey Ltd., the construction was completed on November 14, 2003, after only sixteen months, five months ahead of schedule. The cable stayed design was chosen for aesthetic reasons, as well as having a smaller potential for environmental degradation on the river environment. The anchorages for the cables, at 47 tons (104,000 lbs), are noted as being the heaviest single pieces of steel ever to be galvanized. Total price for the project was US$15.6 million with the following funding sources:

 $5 million from the Ohio Public Works Commission
 $5 million from the Federal Highway Administration
 $3.2 million from the Franklin County Engineer's Office
 $2.4 million from the City of Columbus

Previously, traffic on Lane Avenue was carried by a 3 lane earth filled arch bridge, which opened in 1919. By 1998, it was determined that the bridge was deteriorating; thus a replacement was needed. Construction on the new bridge started on February 27, 2002, with the old bridge being demolished on November 25 of the same year, after the final home football game at Ohio Stadium, nearby.

References

Further reading

External links

Bridges completed in 2003
Cable-stayed bridges in the United States
Bridges in Columbus, Ohio
Road bridges in Ohio
Steel bridges in the United States
Transportation buildings and structures in Franklin County, Ohio